Catholic minister refers to a minister of the Catholic Church.

See also
 Anglican minister
 Christian minister